Shakespearean Fish is the 1996 debut studio album by Juno Award winning Canadian singer-songwriter Melanie Doane. The album was praised in the Canadian music press. Doane toured the album across Canada later that year.

"Never Doubt I Love" is inspired by Hamlet's letter to Ophelia, and "Shakespearean Fish", contains lyrics adapted from a poem by W. B. Yeats. "Tell You Stories" features Ed Robertson of the Barenaked Ladies on co-lead vocals.

Track listing
"Tell You Stories" – 3:43
"All of Sunday" – 3:27
"Never Doubt I Love" – 4:10
"Forgive Me" – 3:51
"Saltwater" – 4:01
"Till I Start to Believe" – 3:48
"Babe in the Woods" – 4:13
"My Sister Sings" – 3:52
"God So Loved" – 4:28
"Silly Me" – 3:35
"Shakespearean Fish" – 2:33

References

1996 debut albums
Melanie Doane albums